Með vættum ("Among Vættir" in Icelandic) is the third full-length album by the Icelandic viking/folk metal band Skálmöld, released on 11 November 2014 via Napalm Records.

Music
Með vættum tells of a woman, Þórunn, born on the north coast of Iceland. During her life, she travels around the island from north, to east, to south, to west. As she does so, she grows older and dies. On each coast she must fight a battle against enemies coming in from sea. She acts as a guardian to the island. In each battle she is aided by a wight, of which there are four traditional versions in Icelandic mythology: vultures from the north, dragon from the east, giant from the south, and a bull from the west, as well as wraiths on the sea all around the isle.

The protagonist was named after the daughter of the band's keyboard player, Gunnar Ben. Songwriter Snæbjörn likes to use names for the characters which are familiar to him and to which he has some connection.

Track listing

Personnel
 Björgvin Sigurðsson – vocals, guitar
 Baldur Ragnarsson – guitar, backing vocals
 Snæbjörn Ragnarsson – bass
 Þráinn Árni Baldvinsson – guitar
 Gunnar Ben – keyboards, oboe
 Jón Geir Jóhannsson – drums

References

2014 albums
Skálmöld albums
Napalm Records albums